Buffalo is an unincorporated community in Hickman County, Tennessee, United States.

Notes

Unincorporated communities in Hickman County, Tennessee
Unincorporated communities in Tennessee